Clingan Jackson (March 28, 1907 – May 26, 1997) was a Democratic politician and newspaperman from Ohio.

Jackson was born in Youngstown, Ohio in 1907, and was raised on the east side of the city and in towns on either side of the Ohio border with Pennsylvania.  He graduated in 1929 from University of Colorado, where he majored in history and English.  He returned to Ohio where he began work in September of that year as a reporter for the Youngstown Vindicator daily newspaper.  He continued work as a reporter and editor for the newspaper until his retirement in 1983.

Jackson was a Democratic candidate for Ohio governor in the 1958 primary.  He also served as a Democratic member of the  Ohio House of Representatives (1934–1936) and the Ohio State Senate (1944–1950).  During his time in the Senate, he authored bills creating the Ohio Department of Natural Resources and requiring the reclamation of land used for strip mining.  He also served as the chair of the Senate Finance Committee in the 98th General Assembly.

Upon leaving the legislature, he was appointed to the Ohio Program Commission by Governor Frank J. Lausche, beginning over 30 years of service on various state commissions and boards.

Jackson died in Youngstown on May 26, 1997.

See also
 Election Results, Ohio Governor (Democratic Primaries)

1907 births
1997 deaths
Democratic Party Ohio state senators
Democratic Party members of the Ohio House of Representatives
Writers from Youngstown, Ohio
20th-century American politicians